Eva Willemarck (born 28 June 1984) is a Belgian bobsledder who has competed since 2007. She finished 14th in the two-woman event at the 2010 Winter Olympics in Vancouver.

Willemarck also finished 18th in the two-woman event at the FIBT World Championships 2009 in Lake Placid, New York. Her best World Cup finish was 14th in the two-woman event at Winterberg in 2009.

References
 

1984 births
Living people
Belgian female bobsledders
Bobsledders at the 2010 Winter Olympics
Olympic bobsledders of Belgium
Place of birth missing (living people)